bbodance, formerly the British Ballet Organization (BBO), is a dance examination board based in London, England.

Overview 
Formerly known as the British Ballet Organization, bbodance was founded in England in 1930 by Edouard Espinosa and his wife Eve Louise Kelland. Edouard Espinosa was a famous dance teacher and Louise was an actress and singer. It was established as a dance teaching society and developed a syllabus of Classical Ballet training.

The BBO is now one of the leading dance examination boards in the United Kingdom and provides an examination syllabus in Classical Ballet, Musical Theatre dance, Tap, Jazz, Modern dance, and Contemporary Dance. The organisation also trains teachers, qualifying them to work in the private and state sectors.

bbodance is a registered dance awarding body of the Council for Dance, Drama and Musical Theatre (CDMT) and its qualifications are accredited by Ofqual(England) and Qualifications Wales. The organisation went through a major rebrand in 2016. Many notable dance artists are associated with it, from Dame Beryl Grey, CH, DBE (President) and Sir David Bintley, CBE (Vice President) to Patrons Craig Revel Horwood, Brenda Last OBE, Mark Baldwin OBE, Agnes Oaks CBE, Bonnie Langford, Doreen Wells, Marchioness of Londonderry, Tandy Muir-Warden, and Wayne Sleep OBE. The organisation's Founder President was Dame Ninette De Valois OM, CH, DBE.

References

External links

Arts organizations established in 1930
Ballet in the United Kingdom
Ballet examination boards
Dance organizations
Dance education in the United Kingdom